Sorochye is a rural locality (a selo) in Tsvetnovsky Selsoviet of Volodarsky District, Astrakhan Oblast, Russia. The population was 945 as of 2010. There are 4 streets.

Geography 
Sorochye is located 28 km southeast of Volodarsky (the district's administrative centre) by road. Kazenny Bugor is the nearest rural locality.

References 

Rural localities in Volodarsky District, Astrakhan Oblast